Dávid Filinský (born 18 January 1999) is a Slovak professional footballer who plays for Tatran Liptovský Mikuláš as a defender.

Club career

MFK Ružomberok
Filinský made his Fortuna Liga debut for Ružomberok in a home fixture against Slovan Bratislava on 6 October 2019, coming on as an added time replacement for Martin Regáli.

References

External links
 MFK Ružomberok official profile 
 Futbalnet profile 
 
 

1999 births
Living people
Sportspeople from Spišská Nová Ves
Slovak footballers
Slovakia youth international footballers
Slovak expatriate footballers
Association football defenders
Pordenone Calcio players
MFK Ružomberok players
MFK Tatran Liptovský Mikuláš players
Serie C players
3. Liga (Slovakia) players
2. Liga (Slovakia) players
Slovak Super Liga players
Expatriate footballers in Italy
Slovak expatriate sportspeople in Italy